This article shows a list of flags of the German Navy, which includes flags, standards and pennants that used in the years between 1935 and 1945 by the German Kriegsmarine and merchant navy.

National and merchant flag

Merchant flag with the Iron Cross

Reichskriegsflagge 
The Reichskriegsflagge, which was introduced on 7 November 1935, was widely used in the Wehrmacht. Thus, it also served the Kriegsmarine as the naval ensign, which was hoisted on Flag days regardless of the location of the ship. These were 1 January (New year), 18 January (founding day of the German Empire in 1871), 30 January ("day of national survey"), 20 April (Adolf Hitler's birthday), 1 May ("Labor Day") and 31 May (anniversary of the World War I Battle of Jutland). In addition, ships in home waters had to hoist the Reichskriegsflagge on 1 March (commemorating the 1935 reintegration of the Territory of the Saar Basin into Germany), 29 August (the day of the founding of the Prussian Navy in 1859), the first Sunday after Michaelmas and the day of the Harvest festival. Regardless of these days, all warships that received a head of state were obliged to show the Reichskriegsflagge.

Reich service flag 
The Reich service flag was used by all state authorities, such as the Reichsbahn, Reichsautobahn and Reichsbank. In the navy, the Reich service flag was carried by all state-owned vessels that were not allowed to hoist the Reichskriegsflagge. In the case of the absence of the Reich service flag, the national and merchant flag had to be flown in its place.

Flags of the Kriegsmarine 
Most command and rank flags of the German navy had traditional character and were already used in the Imperial and before the Prussian Navy. The flag of a Grand Admiral was very similar to the version used in the Imperial Navy. Completely new, however, was the rank of General Admiral, which Erich Raeder, the Commander in Chief of the Kriegsmarine, adopted in 1936. In order to avoid Raeder having a higher rank than the Commander-in-Chief of the Luftwaffe (Colonel General Hermann Goering) and the Army (Generaloberst Werner von Fritsch), the rank of General Admiral was introduced. The actual intended rank of a Grand Admiral as Commander-in-Chief of the Navy was "postponed" and a special flag introduced for a commander-in-chief who is not Grand Admiral. Raeder was promoted to Grand Admiral in 1939, meaning the special flag was still official, but found no use. This continued with the successor of Raeder, Karl Dönitz, who in 1943, was promoted from the rank of Admiral to General Admiral, skipping General Admiral.

Higher command rank flags

Other command flags

Vehicle flags and pennants

War Merit pennants

Flag for Landwehr Kriegsmarine units

Other naval flags

Flags for special occasions

See also 
 List of flags of the Wehrmacht and Heer (1933–1945)
 List of flags of the Luftwaffe (1933–1945)

References

Literatures

External links
 Flags of the world (Flags of the Navy 1933-1945)

Flags
Kriegsmarine
Kriegsmarine flags
German Navy